Star Energy was a British onshore oil exploration company until acquired by IGas Energy in December 2011

History
It was formed in October essentially as a management-buyout of operations in the Weald Basin, acquired from Soco International. The buyout was funded by European Acquisition Capital.

In June 2000, it expanded when it acquired the assets of Roc Oil in the East Midlands Oil Province.

In May 2004 it became a public company, listed on the Alternative Investment Market (AIM). In August 2005, it bought Pentex Oil, and increased its portfolio greatly in the East Midlands. These fields are based near Welton, Lincolnshire at Reepham, near its railway station.

In November 2005 it opened its first gas storage facility at the depleted Humbly Grove oil field, near Lasham in Hampshire. On 7 March 2008, it de-listed from the AIM stock market, becoming subsidiary of Petronas.

In December 2011 all assets, with the exception of Humbly Grove were acquired by IGas .

Structure
It is based on the Strand (A4), between Nelson's Column and Charing Cross station in the City of Westminster.

Divisions
Star Energy Group Ltd is the main company based in London, but it also has nine other smaller companies which house its operations, which include
 Star Energy Weald Basin Ltd, based at the Holybourne.
 Star Energy (East Midlands) Ltd, based at the Welton Gathering Centre and operates the fields of Welton, Stainton, Nettleham, Cold Hanworth, Scampton, Scampton North, and Eskdale.
 Star Energy Oil and Gas Ltd, based near Gainsborough, and operates the fields at Beckingham, Egmanton, Corringham, Glentworth, East Glentworth, Rempstone, Long Clawson, Bothamstall, and South Leverton.

References

External links
 IGas

Petronas
Energy companies established in 1999
Oil and gas companies of the United Kingdom
City of Westminster
British companies established in 1999